These are the list of awards received by 2PM, a South Korean boy group. Their major accolade is winning the Artist of the Year award at the 2009 Mnet Asian Music Awards.


Awards and nominations

Listicles

References

External links

 Official website 

Awards
2PM